The following is a list of mountain passes and gaps in California. California is geographically diverse with numerous roads and railways traversing within its borders. In the middle of the U.S. state lies the California Central Valley, bounded by the coastal mountain ranges in the west, the Sierra Nevada to the east, the Cascade Range in the north and the Tehachapi Mountains in the south. Although most of these passes are now traversed by state highways, some date prior to California's statehood in 1850 and are today registered as California Historical Landmarks.

See also

 List of mountain passes and hills in the Tour of California
 List of Sierra Nevada road passes

References

Mountain passes
Mountain passes